Cantley may refer to:

Places
Cantley, Norfolk, a village in the county of Norfolk, England
Cantley, South Yorkshire, a suburb of Doncaster, England
Cantley, Quebec, a town in the province of Quebec, Canada

People
Joseph Cantley (1910–1993), British High Court judge
Lewis C. Cantley (born 1949), American cell biologist
Nathaniel Cantley (1847–1888), British botanist